The Shops at Willow Bend, sometimes referred to as Willow Bend Mall, is a shopping mall located in Plano, Texas, with over 125 stores and three anchor stores. It is located at the intersection of West Park Boulevard (Farm to Market Road 544) and Dallas North Tollway in West Plano.

History
The mall first opened on August 3, 2001, with about 75% occupancy and four anchor stores. It faced several challenges from the beginning. The luxury mall opened shortly before the September 11 attacks when nationwide retail sales slowed considerably. Stonebriar Centre previously opened less than a year before on August 4, 2000, just a few miles north in nearby Frisco. Stonebriar was also considerably larger, offered more amenities and entertainment such as a movie theater and ice rink, and offered a wider selection of shops and restaurants with broad appeal. The collapse of the telecom corridor to the east of the centers trade area further hampered the mall’s performance. 

The mall was developed and originally managed by Taubman Centers, which was highly selective in accepting tenants. The four original anchor stores were Dillard's, Foley's, Lord & Taylor, and Neiman Marcus. The Lord & Taylor and Neiman Marcus stores were replacements for those at the since-demolished Prestonwood Town Center in north Dallas. Original tenants included several luxury shops such as Escada, Bruno Magli, Burberry, Armani Collezioni, Montblanc, Nicole Miller, Diesel, D&G, and Loro Piana among others, all of which were eventually closed and replaced with chain stores of somewhat broader appeal, including the Apple Store.

In 2004, Saks Fifth Avenue was added as a fifth anchor. Later that year the total number of anchor stores dropped to four as Lord & Taylor closed its location, citing a weak and competitive regional marketplace.

In 2006, Foley's was changed to Macy's. In 2010, the total number of anchor stores dropped to three with the closing of Saks Fifth Avenue. In 2011, a Crate & Barrel opened in the vacant Lord & Taylor.

In 2014, the mall was sold as part of a 7 property package to Starwood Capital Group for approximately $1.4 billion.

In 2015, it was announced the mall would undergo a $126 million makeover and renovation with the former Saks Fifth Avenue building being repurposed with internal and external facing restaurants and entertainment venues.

However, since 2015, traffic dropped significantly, leading to a default on the $137.5 million loan when it matured in November 2019.

In March 2018, the 60,000-square-foot Crayola Experience opened between Macy's and the food court.

In April 2019, Apple Store closed and relocated to Galleria Dallas to help protect Apple from excessive patent litigation in the Eastern District of Texas.

In September 2021, the mall was acquired by Spinoso Real Estate Group.

Current Anchor Tenants 
 Neiman Marcus (153,300 sq ft., opened 2001)
 Dillard's (249,200 sq ft., opened 2001)
 Macy's  (200,000 sq ft., opened as Foley's in 2001, renamed Macy's in 2006)
 Crate & Barrel (29,000 sq ft., opened 2011, built on pad of former Lord & Taylor)

Former Anchor Tenants 
 Lord & Taylor (140,000 sq ft., opened 2001, closed 2004, demolished 2010)
 Saks Fifth Avenue (122,900 sq ft., opened 2004, closed 2010, demolished 2016)

See also 
List of shopping malls in the Dallas/Fort Worth Metroplex
Stonebriar Mall

References

External links

The Shops at Willow Bend home page

Shopping malls in the Dallas–Fort Worth metroplex
Buildings and structures in Plano, Texas
Tourist attractions in Collin County, Texas
Shopping malls established in 2001